The Companhia União Fabril (CUF) was one of the largest and oldest Portuguese conglomerates from the 1930s to 1974 and later a chemical corporation which was by then a part of Grupo José de Mello founded in 1988. After many acquisitions, mergers and divestitures, from the late 1970s to the 2010s, the company known as CUF and its brand was gradually restructured and morphed into a brand-new hospital in Lisbon. Now the brand cuf, whose major shareholders and founders are heirs of the old CUF conglomerate, is tied to one of the majors healthcare providers of Portugal known as cuf saúde with several hospitals across the country.

History
The company was founded by Alfredo da Silva in 1871 and managed by his descendants, including José Manuel de Mello, as a family-run business conglomerate. CUF was one of the largest and most diversified Portuguese corporations from the 1930s until 1974. The company grew and developed as a large conglomerate enforcing a business model with similarities to South Korean chaebols and Japanese keiretsus and zaibatsus. With its core businesses (cement, chemicals, petrochemicals, agrochemicals, textiles, beer, beverages, metallurgy, naval construction, electrical equipment, oilseeds, insurance, banking, wood pulp, tourism, mining, etc.) and corporate headquarters located in mainland Portugal, but also with branches, plants and several developing business projects all around the Portuguese Empire, specially in the Portuguese territories of Angola and Mozambique, CUF was for many years the largest employer and exporter of Portugal. It grew so large that it reached 30 kilometers of private railway lines in Portugal.

After the Carnation Revolution military coup on April 25, 1974, and the fall of the Estado Novo regime that ruled the intercontinental country from 1933 to 1974, CUF entered in collapse. Many of its companies were forcibly nationalized by the communist-inspired National Salvation Junta, and the dismembered company fell into decline, losing all of its splendor and importance. The large conglomerate and many of its diverse companies didn't survive the far-left politics, labor movement-inspired PREC (1975) and its influence over Portuguese economy, society and government policies in the following years. However, after the turmoil of the Carnation Revolution from 1974 to 1976, its communist inspiration fade away from 1977 to 1978 although socialism would still remain mainstream in Portuguese politics for the coming years. In 1979, the founding family (the Mellos) was able to resume its business activity in Portugal and would proceed to found the Grupo José de Mello (José de Mello Group) in 1988. Step by step, the CUF was revived with the acquisition of several chemical industry assets in the country from the 1980s to 1997, when it was in position to buy Quimigal (founded after the forcible nationalizations as the chemical company of the State) in the privatization of that company. During the 1990s and 2000s, CUF's main industrial assets were located in Estarreja where the company produced aniline and nitrobenzene. Also in the 2000s, the company started to develop innovative projects in other fields. The nanotechnology company Innovnano was founded in 2003 by CUF in Aljustrel. Its main facilities, including state-of-the-art research and development center and manufacturing plant, were scheduled to be relocated to the Coimbra's iParque in 2012. In the 2010s, the new CUF was a Portuguese chemical corporation and a part of Grupo José de Mello. After many acquisitions, mergers and divestitures, from the late 1970s to the 2010s, the company and its brand was gradually restructured and morphed into a hospital in Lisbon. Now the brand cuf, whose major shareholders and founders are heirs of the old CUF conglomerate, is tied to one of the majors healthcare providers of Portugal known as cuf saúde.

Cultural endeavours of CUF
The company had also its own sports clubs, founded as truly works teams. This model of sport ownership, also put in place by contemporary companies like Bayer AG, Carl Zeiss AG, Philips NV, Peugeot and others, was successfully replicated and expanded by notable companies of the following century like Red Bull GmbH. The most successful sports club of CUF was founded in 1937 and was located in Lisbon's industrial suburb of Barreiro on the left side of Tagus estuary, and was called Grupo Desportivo da CUF. The club was a major contender in the main Portuguese Football Championship but was later disbanded and replaced by G.D. Fabril due to the 1974 military coup in Portugal. But this sports club in Barreiro was only one of three sports clubs created by the parent company, whose players were also workers. The other clubs were CUF Lisboa, founded in 1936 and now known as Unidos de Lisboa, and the short-lived CUF Porto, that existed between 1945 and 1950.

See also
 Sovena Group

References

External links
 Official website of the new cuf saúde (healthcare)
 Official website of the holding company, heir of the now disbanded old CUF conglomerate, which is owner of cuf saúde (healthcare) and a number of other companies, including chemical companies

Defunct companies of Portugal
Chemical companies of Portugal
Companies established in 1865
Holding companies of Portugal